Mark Darren "Sharky" Robinson (born 21 August 1975 in Palmerston North, New Zealand) is a New Zealand former rugby union and rugby league footballer who played in the 1990s and 2000s. He played international rugby union for the All Blacks between 1997 and 2001. He played provincial rugby in New Zealand for North Harbour and Super 12 rugby for the Waikato Chiefs and then the Auckland Blues. He briefly played rugby league for the New Zealand Warriors before moving overseas to play with Northampton and then London Wasps, both in England. He retired from professional rugby in 2010.

Career in rugby union and rugby league
Born in Palmerston North, Robinson grew up in Whangarei. He emerged as a prospective rugby player when he moved to North Harbour during his teenage years, making the Harbour Colts and New Zealand Colts in 1995 playing in the inaugural World under 21 tournament in Argentina. He entered first-class rugby the following year with Harbour. He played for the Chiefs in the international Super 12 competition. In 1997 he toured with the All Blacks and played three games in Europe and was selected as reserve to Justin Marshall for the final test against England at Twickenham, but injury forced him to sit this out. The following year he played in his first Test against England in Dunedin, for England's Tour of Hell.

In 1999 he moved to the re-organised Auckland Blues, and appeared five times for New Zealand 'A' that season. In 2000 he also played for the New Zealand 'A' side that toured Europe. In 2001 he was recalled to the All Blacks for the end-of-year tour. He played in matches against Ireland and Scotland 'A', as well as the Test against Scotland. He also played in the Test against Argentina.

In 2003 he signed to play rugby league for the New Zealand Warriors for only one season prior to moving to the UK to join up with the Northampton Saints. He played one game at hooker. For most of the year he played for the North Harbour Tigers in the 2005 Bartercard Cup. He also played for the Barbarians from 2002 to 2009 playing a total of 13 games for the famous rugby club and in 2003 Robinson was a member of the Warriors team in the victories over England, Scotland and Wales.

In 2003 he signed for Northampton in the English Premiership, and on 22 May 2008 he transferred to London Wasps.

In May 2010 Robinson called time on his rugby career after a degenerative knee injury forced him to retire after two seasons at the Wasps. He said "It has been a very difficult season for me and despite every effort to come back, my knee injury is just too severe and too painful to continue".

All Blacks statistics 
Tests: 3 (0 as Captain)
Games: 5 (0 as Captain)
Total Matches: 8 (0 as Captain)
Test Points: 5pts (1t, 0c, 0p, 0dg, 0m)
Game Points: 10pts (2t, 0c, 0p, 0dg, 0m)
Total Points: 15pts (3t, 0c, 0p, 0dg, 0m)

References

External links 
 Northampton profile

1975 births
Living people
Barbarian F.C. players
Blues (Super Rugby) players
Chiefs (rugby union) players
New Zealand international rugby union players
New Zealand rugby league players
New Zealand rugby union players
New Zealand Warriors players
North Harbour rugby league team players
North Harbour rugby union players
Northampton Saints players
People educated at Whangarei Boys' High School
Rugby league hookers
Rugby league players from Palmerston North
Rugby union players from Palmerston North
Rugby union scrum-halves
Wasps RFC players